The 2008 MTV EMAs (also known as the MTV Europe Music Awards) were held at the Echo Arena in Liverpool, England, on 6 November 2008. It was hosted by Katy Perry. This was the second time the awards have taken place in England.

Nominations
Winners are in bold text.

Regional nominations
Winners are in bold text.

Performances 
Katy Perry — "I Kissed a Girl"
Beyoncé — "If I Were a Boy"
Take That — "Greatest Day"
The Killers — "Human"
Kanye West — "Love Lockdown"
Estelle and Kanye West — "American Boy"
The Ting Tings — "That's Not My Name"
Kid Rock — "So Hott / All Summer Long"
Duffy — "Mercy"
Pink — "So What"
Katy Perry — "Hot n Cold"
Zaho - La roue tourne

Appearances
Sugababes — presented Best Song
Michael Owen and Anastacia — presented Best Live Act
Travis McCoy and Solange Knowles — presented Best Rock
Craig David — presented Best Album
Grace Jones — presented Best New Act
Kerry Katona and Dirk — presented Best Video
Perez Hilton and Katy Perry — presented Best Act Ever
Leona Lewis — presented Best Urban
Kelly Rowland — presented Artist's Choice Award
Estelle and Tim Cahill — presented Best Act
Bono — presented Ultimate Legend Award
Lauri Ylönen and Tiziano Ferro — presented Best European Act

See also
2008 MTV Video Music Awards

References

External links
Official show site (Archived)
2008 MTV Europe Music Awards at MTV.com
Ultimate Guitar Archives - Rick Rolling the MTV Europe Music Awards

2008 in England
2008
2008 music awards
Culture in Liverpool
2008 in British music
2000s in Liverpool
November 2008 events in the United Kingdom